Koo Ja-wook (born February 12, 1993) is a South Korean professional baseball outfielder currently playing for the Samsung Lions of the KBO League.

In 2015, he beat Kim Ha-sung and Cho Moo-geun to win the Rookie of the Year award.

References

External links
Career statistics and player information from the KBO League

Koo Ja-wook at Samsung Lions Baseball Team

South Korean baseball players
Samsung Lions players
KBO League infielders
KBO League Rookie of the Year Award winners
Sportspeople from Daegu
1993 births
Living people
Neungseong Gu clan